The Regency Cafe  is an art deco style British cafe in Regency Street, London. It first opened in 1946, and has been used as a filming location on several occasions. In 2013, it was voted the fifth best restaurant in London by users of Yelp.

Description
Regency Cafe opened in 1946 on Regency Street, London, near to the borders of Westminster and Pimlico. It was sold by the original owners to Antonio Perotti and Gino Schiavetta in 1986. It is now run by Antonio's daughter, Claudia and Gino's son Marco.

The interior tiling is original, while the tables are newer and Formica topped. Interior decorations include photographs of Tottenham Hotspur football players. The cafe is designed in an art deco style. The cafe has been featured as a filming location in several BBC series such as Judge John Deed , Rescue Me and London Spy. It has also appeared in the films Layer Cake, Brighton Rock, Pride, and Rocketman. In print, it has appeared in the Japanese version of the magazine Vogue and in a Volkswagen advertisement.

Menu
Regency Cafe serves cuisine traditionally seen in a British cafe. It includes a variety of traditional breakfast food such as egg, bacon, sausage, beans, black pudding, tomatoes as well as newer additions such as eggs Benedict and hash browns. The tea served was described by Harry Wallop for The Daily Telegraph, as "Proper builders’ tea, the stuff that once fuelled the docks, factories and steelworks of Britain; a mug of pure, liquid copper." Other items include a homemade steak pie and chips.

Reception
In 2013, Regency Cafe was voted as the fifth best restaurant in London by users of the website Yelp. It had already been included in a list of the top five less expensive places to eat in the UK, also produced by Yelp for the Wall Street Journal. Harry Wallop, writing for The Daily Telegraph in April 2013, described Regency Cafe as the "real deal" when it came to retro style cafes. He praised the food served, saying that it was rough but tasted good. A Time Out review in April 2013 called the food "stodgetastic" and gave it a score of three out of five.

References

Restaurants established in 1946
Restaurants in London
1946 in London
1946 establishments in England
Coffeehouses and cafés in London